Juan Paolo "Jaypee" Aquino is a Filipino TV director and photographer. He has been producing and directing for Philippine TV for more than a decade.

A graduate of the London Film School, Aquino lived in London during his college years and worked in a number of international film productions before going back to Manila. Some of his short films were exhibited in a number of major  film festivals throughout Europe.

Career 
In early 2000, Aquino was assigned to direct travel documentaries for a Filipino International Channel. He then started producing for mainstream TV in 2001, one of which was for Digital Tour—now considered the longest running magazine show on technology in the Philippines. He also directed a diversity of local magazine shows for TV - Kiss The Cook with Ryan Agoncillo, The Good Life with Cory Quirino, Chef's On The Go with Mark Gil and Hanap Buhay Overseas with Angelique Lazo.

He also started his own personal project and tried his knack for photography. He spent more than five months travelling around Southeast Asia, China, and South America  to document the wealth of cultures from the different countries in the region. Emotional Core was the name of the project. Some of his works have also been selected to be a part of the Dazed And Confused European Exhibit Project.

He  directed the daily showbiz talk show Juicy!, and the social media music show SPINNation which aired on TV5.

Filmography

References
  
 
 
 
 
 
 
 
 
 

Year of birth missing (living people)
Living people
Filipino film directors
Filipino photographers
Filipino television directors
People from Manila